Eucalyptus baiophylla is a mallee that is endemic to the far west of Western Australia. It has rough, fibrous bark on all its stems, linear adult leaves, oval buds in groups of five or seven, white flowers and conical to more or less barrel-shaped fruit. It is similar to E. prominens which has less rough bark, larger, wider leaves and fruit with the valves more protruding.

Description 
It has rough, loose, fibrous bark on all its stems. The operculum is hemispherical to conical, about the same length as the flower cup.

Taxonomy and naming
Eucalyptus baiophylla was first formally described in 2012 by Dean Nicolle and Ian Brooker from a specimen collected on the road to Exmouth, 48km from the North West Coastal Highway. The specific epithet (baiophylla) is derived from the Ancient Greek words baios meaning "little" and phyllon meaning "leaf", referring to the small leaves of this species compared to those of E. zopherophloia and E. prominens.

Distribution and habitat
This eucalypt grows in sand over limestone, often on low rises and occurs on the Giralia Range between the Exmouth Gulf and Lake MacLeod in the Carnarvon biogeographic region.

Conservation
Eucalyptus baiophylla is classified as "not threatened" by the Western Australian Government Department of Parks and Wildlife.

See also
List of Eucalyptus species

References

baiophylla
Myrtales of Australia
Eucalypts of Western Australia
Plants described in 2012
Taxa named by Ian Brooker